The 1988 VMI Keydets football team was an American football team that represented the Virginia Military Institute (VMI) as a member of the Southern Conference (SoCon) during the 1988 NCAA Division I-AA football season. In their fourth year under head coach Eddie Williamson, the team compiled an overall record of 2–9, with a mark of 1–5 in conference play, placing sixth in the SoCon. Williamson resigned in December, and compiled an all-time record of 10–33–1 during his tenure of head coach of the Keydets from 1985 through 1988.

Schedule

References

VMI
VMI Keydets football seasons
VMI Keydets football